Gia Margaret is an American singer-songwriter and producer from Chicago, Illinois. She was trained in classical piano as a child and began pursuing a degree in music before ending both endeavors because they were “creatively limiting”. Margaret has had various jobs prior to becoming a musician, including a nanny, book store clerk, and dental assistant. She released her first full length album, There’s Always Glimmer, in July 2018. She describes the genre of her music as “sleep rock,” and has been compared to everyone from Imogen Heap to Postal Service. Margaret has been steadily rising in popularity in the music industry and has 464,994 monthly listeners on Spotify as of March 7, 2020.

Touring 
In 2019, she toured around the United States with Welsh alternative folk singer-songwriter Novo Amor. In September of that year, she went on her first headlining tour in the UK. Margaret was selected to perform at SXSW 2019, a music festival in Austin, Texas, and was later selected by NPR to be part of the Austin 100. This is a playlist of “a hundred handpicked highlights from among the thousands of acts playing SXSW 2019”.

Discography 

Margaret has released one full length album, 2018’s There’s Always Glimmer. This album was re-released on May 24, 2019 with two additional tracks, “Smoke (Acoustic)” and “Babies”. Beyond her LP, she released an Audiotree live album on November 14, 2018 that included live performances of six songs. Margaret’s song “Birthday” was remixed by artists Ryan Hemsworth and swim good now and released on streaming services on September 3, 2019. Margaret has two record labels, Orindal in the United States and Dalliance in the UK. While touring with Novo Amor, the two artists recorded and released two songs on February 28 2019, “Lucky for You” and “No Fun”. On Spotify, “Lucky for You” has 3.8 million streams and “No Fun” has 2.6 million streams as of March 7, 2020 and remain Margaret’s most streamed songs on the platform. In 2020, she released her second full-length record, "Mia Gargaret"

References

Living people
Singers from Chicago
Year of birth missing (living people)